Malatipur Assembly constituency is an assembly constituency in Malda district in the Indian state of West Bengal.

Overview
Malatipur Assembly constituency consists of 209 booths (parts) among which 144 parts (From part no.1 to part no.144) fall under Chanchal-II Development Block and the rest belongs to Ratua II Development Block. As per orders of the Delimitation Commission, 47 Malatipur Assembly constituency covers Chanchal II community development block and Maharajpur, Peerganj, Sreepur I and Sreepur II gram panchayats of Ratua II community development block.

Malatipur Assembly constituency is part of 7. Maldaha Uttar (Lok Sabha constituency).

Members of Legislative Assembly

Election results

2021

2016
In the 2016 election, Alberuni Zulkarnain of Indian National Congress defeated his nearest rival Abdur Rahim Boxi of Revolutionary Socialist Party (India).

2011
In the 2011 election, Abdur Rahim Boxi of RSP defeated his nearest rival Al-beruni (Independent).

Al-Beruni, contesting as an Independent candidate, was a Congress Zilla Parishad member.

References

Assembly constituencies of West Bengal
Politics of Malda district